Francis Roscarrock (fl. 1553–1554) was an English politician.

Life
We know almost nothing of Roscarrock except that he sat in four parliaments. He is described as a 'gentleman', and the Roscarrocks were influential in the area; presumably he was one of the family. The head of the Roscarrocks, Richard Roscarrock, was a knight of the shire at the same time as Francis, representing Cornwall. Francis had a brother, Thomas Roscarrock, who, like Francis, was an MP for Liskeard.

Career
He was a Member (MP) of the Parliament of England for Newport, Cornwall in March 1553, for Camelford in October 1553 and November 1554, and for Liskeard in April 1554.

References

Year of birth missing
Year of death missing
English MPs 1553 (Edward VI)
English MPs 1553 (Mary I)
English MPs 1554
English MPs 1554–1555